Pancrase: Yes, We Are Hybrid Wrestlers 2 was a mixed martial arts event held on October 14, 1993 at the Tsuyuhashi Sports Center in Nagoya, Aichi, Japan.

Background
The event featured future King of Pancrase champions Masakatsu Funaki, Bas Rutten, Ken Shamrock, and Minoru Suzuki. Headlining the promotion's second mma event was future UFC Hall of Famer Ken Shamrock against Kazuo Takahashi. Other notable fights on the card were Minoru Suzuki, who took on Vernon White. Pancrase co-founder Funaki took on Ryushi Yanagisawa, while Bas Rutten faced Takaku Fuke.

Results

See also 
 Pancrase
 List of Pancrase champions
 List of Pancrase events
 1993 in Pancrase

References

External links
 Official Pancrase Website
 Sherdog.com event results

1993 in mixed martial arts
Mixed martial arts in Japan
Sport in Nagoya
1993 in Japanese sport
Pancrase events